Derryhiveny Castle is a tower house and National Monument located in County Galway, Ireland.

Location

History

The O'Madden family held the lands around Derryhivenny from c. AD 950 until the middle of the seventeenth century. On 5 February 1639, the head of the family, John O'Madden died, leaving his lands to his son, Daniel O'Madden. Daniel then set about building himself a tower house.

The castle was built in 1643 by Daniel O'Madden.

Its date is known from an inscription on one of its bartizan corbels: D:O'M ME:FIERI:FECIT 1643.

Description

Derryhiveny Castle is a tower house of four storeys. There are vaults on all four storeys.

The upper rooms have two- and three-mullioned windows with fireplaces, including one with a chamfered lintel, curved downwards at each end and covered by a chamfered cornice.

There are also remains of a bawn, wall walk and crenellations.

References

National Monuments in County Galway
Castles in County Galway